Alan Paterson Crawford (born 30 October 1953) is an English former footballer who made more than 450 Football League appearances scoring 98 goals playing as an outside left.

Career

Crawford started his football career with Rotherham United and went on to make 169 consecutive appearances for them. He scored 31 Football League goals in their Third Division campaign in 1976–77, which is a Rotherham record for a midfielder. In 2007, he was voted as the greatest ever left-sided midfielder for Rotherham, in a Millers Mad poll.

He later moved to Chesterfield, and scored the winning goal for them in their 1980/81 Anglo-Scottish Cup victory over Notts County. Crawford subsequently played for Bristol City, Exeter City, Bath City and Bristol Manor Farm. He rejoined Bristol City as a youth team coach before retiring from football working as a painter & decorator in Backwell near Bristol in the late 1990s.

Coach/Scout

In recent years he has established himself as a football coach with clubs such as Blackpool, Stockport County, West Bromwich Albion and Nottingham Forest, working notably for Gary Megson. He is currently a scout for his hometown team Rotherham United.

References

External links

1953 births
Living people
Footballers from Rotherham
English footballers
Association football wingers
Rotherham United F.C. players
Chesterfield F.C. players
Mansfield Town F.C. players
Bristol City F.C. players
Exeter City F.C. players
English Football League players
Bath City F.C. players
Southern Football League players